Johan Gustaf Anton Gustafsson (6 February 1877 – 16 November 1943) was a Swedish athlete who won a bronze medal in the tug of war competition at the 1906 Intercalated Games. Gustafsson was a Swedish weightlifting champion in 1905–1907, and it is unclear why he did not compete in weightlifting at the 1906 Games.

References

1877 births
1943 deaths
Sportspeople from Stockholm
Tug of war competitors at the 1906 Intercalated Games
Gymnasts at the 1906 Intercalated Games
Medalists at the 1906 Intercalated Games